Brian A. Reid was born in Fort Erie, Ontario and presently resides in Ottawa, Ontario. He was a Canadian soldier and is a military historian.

Biography

Reid joined the Canadian Army in 1957 as a gunner and was commissioned as an officer in 1961. He served in regimental, staff and liaison appointments in Canada, Europe and the United States during his long career. His last appointment, before his retirement as a Lieutenant-Colonel in 1994, was in the Joint Plans and Operations Staff at National Defence Headquarters in Ottawa.

Reid has written a number of works on Canadian military history.  His book NO HOLDING BACK: Operation TOTALIZE, Normandy, August 1944 has met with critical praise. John Marteinson, former editor of Canadian Military Journal and teacher at the Royal Military College of Canada wrote: "This book should be in the library of every student of Canadian military history."

Selected bibliography
No Holding Back: Operation Totalize, Normandy, August 1944
Named by the Enemy: A History of The Royal Winnipeg Rifles
Our Little Army in the Field: The Canadians in South Africa
Fighting For Canada: Seven Battles, 1758-1945 (chapters)
More Fighting for Canada: Five Battles, 1760-1944 (chapters)
RCHA - Right of the Line (co-author)
Canada at War and Peace II: A Millennium of Military Heritage (contributor)

References

Canadian military historians
Canadian male non-fiction writers
People from Fort Erie, Ontario
Historians of World War II
Living people
Year of birth missing (living people)